Saadi Wakhri Hai Shaan is a 2012 Punjabi movie directed by Gurbir Singh Grewal and written by Inder Roop Singh Ghuman. It is produced by Inder Roop Singh Ghuman, Dr. Sukhpal Singh Mangat and Bikramjit Singh Gill under the banner of Vibgyor Creations. The star cast includes Sangram Singh, Mandy Takhar, Gurpreet Ratol, Mannu Sandhu Binnu Dhillon, Rana Ranbir and Harpal Singh. Music has been given by Dilpreet Bhatia. Screenplay and lyrics are also written by Inder Roop Singh Ghuman.

Resources
 http://www.punjabnewsline.com/news/Starcast-of-__-Saadi-vakhri-hai-shaan___-interacts-with-students.html
 http://www.rottentomatoes.com/m/saadi_wakhri_hai_shaan/

2012 films
Punjabi-language Indian films
2010s Punjabi-language films